The Giro delle Regioni was a multi-day cycling race held annually in Italy. It is part of UCI Europe Tour in category 2.ncup, meaning it was part of the UCI Under 23 Nations' Cup.

Winners

References

Cycle races in Italy
UCI Europe Tour races
Recurring sporting events established in 1976
1976 establishments in Italy
2010 disestablishments in Italy
Recurring sporting events disestablished in 2010
Defunct cycling races in Italy